Kirazlı, or Kirazlı-Bağcılar, is an underground rapid transit complex of the Istanbul Metro and is serviced by lines M1B and M3.

Kirazlı opened on 14 June 2013 as the southern terminus of the M3 line and eastern terminus of the M1B line. Since the M3 is considered a "continuation" of the M1B, passengers can transfer between these two lines for free. Kirazlı is the only station that offers free transfer in Istanbul. The station was inaugurated with a large ceremony in which officials from the Istanbul Municipality and Istanbul Ulaşım took part.

On January 12, 2017, Lakhe Mashrapov, a man convicted of the 2017 Istanbul nightclub shooting was seen in the station and service to the station was suspended due to a search in an attempt to find him.

Layout

M1 platform

M3 platform

References

Railway stations opened in 2013
2013 establishments in Turkey
Istanbul metro stations
Bağcılar